Glas may refer to:
 Hans Glas GmbH, a former German automotive company
 Glas (film), a 1958 Dutch documentary film
 Glas (book), a 1974 book by Jacques Derrida
 Glas (publisher), a Russian publishing house
 Glas (surname)
 Eochaid Faebar Glas, a mythical High King of Ireland
 Glas (political party), Croatian acronym of Građansko-liberalni savez, Civic Liberal Alliance
 Glas, former name of Glas Srpske, a Bosnian-Herzegovinian newspaper
 Glas (TV channel), Ukrainian satellite channel

See also
 Eilean Glas, Scalpay, in the Outer Hebrides, Scotland
 Doktor Glas, a 1905 novel by Hjalmar Söderberg
 Glass (disambiguation)